At the 1930 British Empire Games in Hamilton, Ontario, Canada, there were two aquatics disciplines – swimming and diving. There were four diving events contested and eleven swimming events. The aquatics programme included the only women's events of the games.

These events were held at the Municipal Pool (now the Jimmy Thompson Memorial Pool), which was built specifically for these games. At that time, it was the best competition pool in the British Empire.

Medal summary

Diving

Men's events

Women's events

Swimming

Men's events

Women's events

References

Commonwealth Games Medallists - Swimming and Diving (Men). GBR Athletics. Retrieved on 2010-07-21.
Commonwealth Games Medallists - Swimming and Diving (Women). GBR Athletics. Retrieved on 2010-07-21.

1930 British Empire Games events
1930
1930 in sports